Plainby is a rural locality in the Toowoomba Region, Queensland, Australia.

History 
The locality takes its name from its school.

A United Methodist Church opened in August 1900. Over 300 people attended the opening.

Plainby Provisional School opened circa 1889. On 1 January 1909 it became Plainby State School. It closed in 1959.

References 

Toowoomba Region
Localities in Queensland